HMS Snipe was a gun-brig and the first Royal Navy ship to bear the name Snipe. Her grounding in 1807 inspired the invention of the Manby Mortar, an important development in maritime lifesaving equipment.

History
HMS Snipe was a gun-brig of the Bloodhound class, designed by Sir John Henslow. Snipe and nine other similar vessels were ordered on 7 January 1801, the draught was approved three days later, and all were being built by the end of the month. She was built by Balthazar and Edward Adams of Bucklers Hard and was launched on 2 May 1801.

1807 grounding
The wreck was witnessed by captain George William Manby. Following this tragedy, Manby experimented with mortars, and so invented the Manby Mortar, (later used with the breeches buoy), that fired a thin rope from shore into the rigging of a ship in distress. A strong rope, attached to the thin one, could be pulled aboard the ship.

Anholt
A party of seamen and marines under the command of Captain William Selby of Owen Glendower, with the assistance of Captain Edward Nicolls of the Standards marines, landed. The Danish garrison of 170 men put up a sharp but ineffectual resistance that killed one marine and wounded two; the garrison then capitulated. The British took immediate possession of the island. Hollis stated that Anholt was important as a source of water to the Navy, and as a good anchorage for merchant vessels going to or coming from the Baltic.

Later career
Snipe became a mooring lighter in 1815. She was broken up in May 1846. A second Royal Navy ship bearing the name HMS Snipe was launched in 1828.

See also
 List of gun-brigs of the Royal Navy

References

1801 ships
Ships built in England
Brigs of the Royal Navy
Maritime incidents in 1807
Shipwrecks of England